The Long Island Composers Alliance (LICA) is a not-for-profit performing arts organization.  

LICA was founded by composers Herbert Deutsch and Marga Richter in 1972 and incorporated in 1975. It has received support from various state, county and local government, foundations and arts organizations.

The Current Board of Directors for the 2018-2020 term is: 

 President:  Laurence Dresner
 Vice President: Herbert  Deutsch
 Secretary: Jay Anthony Gach
 Treasurer: George Cork Maul
 Business Director: George Cork Maul
 Public Relations Director: Adam Levin
 Concerts Directors: Julie Mandel/Jane Leslie

References

External links 
Long Island Composers Alliance (official website)

Organizations based in New York (state)
Music organizations based in the United States
Arts organizations established in 1972
1972 establishments in New York (state)